Guna Junction railway station is a main railway station in Guna district, Madhya Pradesh. Its code is GUNA. It serves Guna city. The station consists of three platforms. The platforms are well sheltered. It has many facilities including water and sanitation.

Guna Junction is well connected to major parts of the state as well as country such as Delhi, Mumbai, Pune, Bhopal, Indore, Jabalpur, Gwalior, Chennai, Kolkata, Ajmer, Agra, Jaipur etc. It is one of the busiest and major stations in the state.

Guna is on route from Indore to New Delhi and is located on Mumbai Agra National Highway. Guna City is famous for Hanumaan Tekri temple & also houses few good hotels of which Playotel Premier, Guna is the best hotel in Guna city. Playotel Premier, Guna is in mid-city and very close to Guna Railway station.

Major trains
 Bhagat Ki Kothi–Tambaram Humsafar Express
 Ujjaini Express
 Santragachi–Ajmer Weekly Express
 Khwaja Garib Nawaz Madar–Kolkata Express
 Bhagalpur–Ajmer Express
 Visakhapatnam–Bhagat Ki Kothi Express
 Sabarmati Express
 Pune–Gwalior Weekly Express
 Gorakhpur–Okha Express
 Jhansi–Bandra Terminus Express
 Surat–Muzaffarpur Express
 Ratlam–Gwalior Intercity Express
 Durg–Jaipur Weekly Express
 Indore–Dehradun Express
 Indore–Amritsar Express
 Indore–Chandigarh Express
 Dayodaya Express
 Bhopal–Gwalior Intercity Express
 Guna–Bina Passenger (unreserved)

References

Railway junction stations in Madhya Pradesh
Railway stations in Guna district
Bhopal railway division